TRNA (adenine22-N1)-methyltransferase (TrmK, YqfN, Sp1610 (gene), tRNA: m1A22 methyltransferase) is an enzyme with systematic name S-adenosyl-L-methionine:tRNA (adenine22-N1)-methyltransferase. This enzyme catalyses the following chemical reaction

 S-adenosyl-L-methionine + adenine22 in tRNA  S-adenosyl-L-homocysteine + N1-methyladenine22 in tRNA

The enzyme specifically methylates adenine22 in tRNA.

References

External links 
 

EC 2.1.1